Ridin' Dirty is the third studio album by American hip hop duo UGK. It was released on July 30, 1996 by Jive Records. Despite no music videos or official singles being released, it is their best selling album with over 850,000 copies sold to date, with 70,000 copies sold in its first week.

Critical reception

After receiving little attention from national critics upon its release, the album received widespread critical acclaim. Tom Breihan of Stereogum writes that as a producer, Pimp C "absorbed lessons from West Coast producers like Dr. Dre and DJ Quik, putting their cinematic musicality to work."

Influence
The album became one of the most influential albums in Southern hip hop, especially the Houston hip hop scene. Prior to his murder, the legendary rapper Tupac Shakur listened to the album in 1996 by way of the Houston rapper Scarface and praised it.

Track listing

Sample credits
"One Day" contains a sample of "Ain't I Been Good to You" performed by Isley Brothers.
"Pinky Ring" contains a sample of "Future Shock" performed by Curtis Mayfield.
"Diamonds & Wood" contains samples of "Munchies for Your Love" performed by Bootsy Collins and "Elbows Swang" performed by .380.
“3 in the Mornin’” contains samples of “Hyperbolicsyllabicsesquedalymistic” performed by Isaac Hayes and “Look What You Find” performed by George Duke
"Good Stuff" contains samples of "Backstrokin'" performed by The Fatback Band and "Money" performed by Pink Floyd.
"Ridin' Dirty" contains samples of "Mister Mellow" performed by Maynard Ferguson and "Angel" performed by Wes Montgomery.
"Outro" contains samples of "Munchies for Your Love" performed by Bootsy Collins.

Charts

Weekly charts

Year-end charts

References

1996 albums
UGK albums
Jive Records albums
Albums produced by N.O. Joe